Camille Alphonse  is a given name. Notable people with the name include:
 Camille Alphonse Faure (1840-1898), French chemical engineer
 Camille Alphonse Trézel (1780-1860), French général de division, Minister for War and peer of France during the July Monarchy

See also 
 Alphonse (disambiguation)

French masculine given names
Compound given names